Joaquim Malgosa Morera (born 1 November 1963 in Terrassa, Catalonia) is a former field hockey defender.

He played for the Atlètic Terrassa all his career, and won the silver medal with the men's national team at the 1996 Summer Olympics in Atlanta, Georgia. He also participated in the 1988 and 1992 Summer Olympics.

Trophies
 1 EuroHockey Club Champions Cup (1985)
 1 European CupWinners cup (1994)
 11 Leagues
 10 Cups
 12 Catalonia Championships

International appearances
 3 Olympic Games (Seoul 88, Barcelona 92, Atlanta 96)
 3 Hockey World Cup (London 86, Lahore 90, Sydney 94)
 3 EuroHockey Nations Championship (Moscow 87, Paris 91, Dublin 95)
 3 Champions Trophy (Amsterdam 87, Lahore 88, Kuala Lumpur 93)
 2 Intercontinental Cups (Barcelona 85, Poznan 93)

References
Career review

External links
 

1963 births
Living people
Field hockey players from Catalonia
Spanish male field hockey players
Male field hockey defenders
Olympic field hockey players of Spain
Olympic silver medalists for Spain
Field hockey players at the 1988 Summer Olympics
Field hockey players at the 1992 Summer Olympics
Field hockey players at the 1996 Summer Olympics
Field hockey players at the 2000 Summer Olympics
1998 Men's Hockey World Cup players
Medalists at the 1996 Summer Olympics
Atlètic Terrassa players
1990 Men's Hockey World Cup players
Sportspeople from Terrassa
20th-century Spanish people